Barry Hugh Wakelin  (born 7 May 1946) is an Australian politician, who was a Liberal member of the Australian House of Representatives from March 1993 until November 2007, representing the Division of Grey, South Australia. He was born in Kimba, South Australia, and was a farmer and small businessman before entering politics.  In 1993, he stood as the Liberal candidate in Grey, historically one of the few country seats where Labor consistently did well. He became only the fifth non-Labor member ever to win it, and the second in 50 years.

While Wakelin's win was and still is considered an upset, the election came at a very bad time for Labor in South Australia. The incumbent state Labor government was still reeling from the collapse of the State Bank of South Australia, and would be heavily defeated at the state election held later in 1993. At that latter election, Labor lost all but one seat within Grey's borders, in some cases on large and permanent swings.

In 1996, Wakelin became the first non-Labor member in 53 years to be re-elected to Grey.  He picked up a large swing of over six percent, turning Grey into a safe Liberal seat in one stroke. He held it without difficulty until his retirement in 2007.

He is also father of Ten News reporter James Wakelin and father-in-law of Ten News presenter Rebecca Morse.

References

External links
Personal website

1946 births
Living people
Liberal Party of Australia members of the Parliament of Australia
Members of the Australian House of Representatives
Members of the Australian House of Representatives for Grey
Recipients of the Medal of the Order of Australia
21st-century Australian politicians
20th-century Australian politicians